Al Mansoura is a district in Qatar, located in the municipality of Ad Dawhah. Together with Fereej Bin Durham, it makes up Zone 25 which has a total population of 37,082.

Geography
Al Mansoura borders the following districts:
Nuaija to the south, separated by C Ring Road.
Rawdat Al Khail to the west, separated by Rawdat Al Khail Street.
Fereej Bin Durham to the north, separated by Al Mansoura Street.
Najma to the east, separated by Najma Street.

Landmarks

Optical Centre on C Ring Road.
Qatar Printing and Advertising Co. on Al Suhail Street.
Al Jaber Group Holding on C Ring Road.
Attestation and Certificates Equivalency Unit on C Ring Road.
State Audit Bureau on C Ring Road.
Government Services Complex on C Ring Road.
General Electricals Office on C Ring Road.
Job Qualifying Centre on C Ring Road.

Transport

Road
Mowasalat is the official transport company in Qatar and serves the community through its operation of public bus routes. Al Mansoura is served by four bus lines, two of which depart from Al Ghanim Bus Station and two of which depart at the Asian Town Bus Station.

Route 10 has stops at Najma and Al Mansoura and a terminus at Al Thumama at Bus Stop 5, running at a frequency of every 30 minutes on all days of the week. Route 12 has stops at Al Mansoura, the Medical Commission and the Religious Complex and a terminus at the New Workers Clinic in Barwa City, also running at frequency of every 30 minutes on all days of the week. Route 301C has stops at the Religious Complex, Al Mansoura and Villaggio Mall and a terminus at Karwa Bus Station, also running at frequency of every 30 minutes on all days of the week. Finally, route 304C is identical to route 301C except for having its stops in a reverse order.

==RailAl mansoura has a metro station on the green line of the metro.

Education
The following school is located in Al Mansoura:

References

Communities in Doha